Robert Stewart (April 12, 1967 – June 4, 2022) was an American football lineman who played twelve seasons in the Arena Football League (AFL) with the Charlotte Rage, New Jersey Red Dogs, New York Dragons, Arizona Rattlers and Carolina Cobras. He was drafted by the New Orleans Saints in the eighth round of the 1992 NFL Draft. He played college football at the University of Alabama. He was named All-Arena six times in his career and won the Lineman of the Year award in 1999.

References

External links
Just Sports Stats

1967 births
2022 deaths
American football offensive linemen
American football defensive tackles
Players of American football from Alabama
African-American players of American football
Alabama Crimson Tide football players
Charlotte Rage players
New Jersey Red Dogs players
New York Dragons players
Arizona Rattlers players
Carolina Cobras players
People from Houston County, Alabama